Damariscotta (/dæmrɪˈskɒtə/ ) is a town in Lincoln County, Maine, United States. The population was 2,297 at the 2020 census. Damariscotta is the oyster capital of New England. A popular tourist destination, the towns of Damariscotta and Newcastle are linked by the Main Street bridge over the Damariscotta River, forming the "Twin Villages". The name Damariscotta derives from a native place-name meaning place of abundance of small fish (alewives).

History

The area was once inhabited by the Wawenock (or Walinakiak, meaning "People of the Bays") Abenaki Indians, who left behind 2,500-year-old oyster shell middens along the banks of the Damariscotta River. The Whaleback Shell Midden is now a state historic site. The land became part of the Pemaquid Patent, granted by the Plymouth Council in 1631 to Robert Aldsworth and Gyles Elbridge, merchants from Bristol, England. At Pemaquid (now Bristol), they built a fort and trading post.

Some colonists moved upriver from the village at Pemaquid about 1640 to settle what is today Damariscotta. But the settlements were attacked in 1676 during King Philip's War, with the  inhabitants either driven off or massacred. Attempts to rebuild alternated with further attacks during the French and Indian Wars. The Province of Massachusetts Bay constructed Fort William Henry at Pemaquid in 1692, but it was destroyed in 1696. The last battle of King William's War was on September 9, the Battle of Damariscotta, in which Captain John March killed 25 native men.

Fort Frederick, in 1729, successfully resisted the region's final two attacks, and was pulled down at the time of the Revolution so that the British could not occupy it. With peace at last, Damariscotta grew as a trade center. It was incorporated as a separate town on March 15, 1848, set off from parts of Bristol and Nobleboro.

The name Damariscotta is an extreme corruption of the Algonquian word "Madamescontee", meaning "place of an abundance of alewives", which are small, salty fish that spawn in Damariscotta Lake. The main village is located at the lower falls and head of navigation on the Damariscotta River. Early industries included two sawmills, a match factory and a tannery. Along the river were established several brickyards, which supplied much of the brick used to build Boston's Back Bay neighborhood. Shipbuilding in particular brought Damariscotta wealth in the 1800s, when clipper ships were launched at the town's shipyards. During that time, many fine examples of Federal, Greek Revival and Italianate style architecture were erected, giving the old seaport a considerable charm which each summer attracts throngs of tourists. Damariscotta is home of the Skidompha Public Library, whose name is an acronym formed from the first letter of several founders' surnames.

The terminus of the Damariscotta River is the Great Salt Bay, which is the northernmost mating area for horseshoe crabs in North America, and the state's first marine protected area. The river is home to 80% of the farmed oysters produced in Maine.

Geography

Damariscotta is situated on the Damariscotta River, a tidal estuary of the Gulf of Maine. Hunt Hill, elevation 350 feet (108 m) above sea level, is the town's highest point.

Demographics

2010 census

As of the census of 2010, there were 2,218 people, 1,051 households, and 578 families residing in the town. The racial makeup of the town was 97.0% White, 0.4% African American, 0.8% Asian, 0.3% from other races, and 1.4% from two or more races. Hispanic or Latino of any race were 0.6% of the population.

There were 1,051 households, of which 22.6% had children under the age of 18 living with them, 41.8% were married couples living together, 10.4% had a female householder with no husband present, 2.9% had a male householder with no wife present, and 45.0% were non-families. 39.7% of all households were made up of individuals, and 20.7% had someone living alone who was 65 years of age or older. The average household size was 2.03 and the average family size was 2.66.

The median age in the town was 50.7 years. 18.2% of residents were under the age of 18; 6.5% were between the ages of 18 and 24; 17.7% were from 25 to 44; 27.8% were from 45 to 64; and 29.8% were 65 years of age or older. The gender makeup of the town was 44.2% male and 55.8% female.

2000 census

As of the census of 2000, there were 2,041 people, 942 households, and 548 families residing in the town. The racial makeup of the town was 98.92% White, 0.20% African American, 0.20% Native American, 0.24% Asian, 0.05% from other races, and 0.39% from two or more races. Hispanic or Latino of any race were 0.49% of the population.

There were 942 households, out of which 23.5% had children under the age of 18 living with them, 46.4% were married couples living together, 7.9% had a female householder with no husband present, and 41.8% were non-families. 36.6% of all households were made up of individuals, and 19.9% had someone living alone who was 65 years of age or older.  The average household size was 2.06 and the average family size was 2.65.

In the town, the population was spread out, with 19.6% under the age of 18, 5.2% from 18 to 24, 21.3% from 25 to 44, 23.4% from 45 to 64, and 30.5% who were 65 years of age or older.  The median age was 48 years. For every 100 females, there were 83.0 males.  For every 100 females age 18 and over, there were 76.0 males.

The median income for a household in the town was $36,188, and the median income for a family was $47,105. Males had a median income of $31,953 versus $23,064 for females. The per capita income for the town was $23,146.  About 6.7% of families and 11.7% of the population were below the poverty line, including 16.4% of those under age 18 and 5.7% of those age 65 or over.

Education

Damariscotta is part of the Maine AOS #93 school system. Steven Bailey is the Superintendent of Schools.

Notable people 

 Kate Aldrich, mezzo-soprano
 Anna Belknap, actress
 Bud Blake, cartoonist
 Charles A. Boutelle, naval officer, US congressman
 Glenn Chadbourne, illustrator
 Gene G. Chandler, speaker of the New Hampshire House of Representatives
 Barbara Cooney, children's author and illustrator
 Jessica Delfino, singer and songwriter, stand-up comic
 Ezra B. French, US congressman
 Ryan Gaul, actor known for his role in The Last O.G.
 Hilton Kramer, art critic
 Bob Page, musician
 Frank Springer, cartoonist and comic book illustrator
 Betty Twarog, biochemist

References

External links

Town of Damariscotta, Maine
Damariscotta Region Chamber of Commerce
Downtown Damariscotta Information

 
Towns in Lincoln County, Maine
Towns in Maine